Renato Pollini (8 February 1925 – 20 August 2010) was an Italian politician.

Biography
Pollini was a member of the Italian Communist Party and was elected Mayor of Grosseto on 29 July 1951. He was re-elected for other three terms in 1956, 1960 and 1964. Pollini served as assessor and member of the Regional Council of Tuscany from 1970 to 1985.

He served at the Italian Parliament as a member of the Senate for two legislatures (IX, X).

See also
1983 Italian general election
1987 Italian general election
List of mayors of Grosseto

References

Bibliography

External links

1925 births
2010 deaths
Mayors of Grosseto
Members of the Regional Council of Tuscany
Democratic Party of the Left politicians
Italian Communist Party politicians
Politicians from Grosseto
Senators of Legislature IX of Italy
Senators of Legislature X of Italy